Andi Matichak is an American actress. She first appeared in television series such as 666 Park Avenue, Orange Is the New Black and Blue Bloods, before making her film  debut as Allyson Nelson in the horror film series Halloween and its sequels.

Early life
Matichak was born in Framingham, Massachusetts, but raised in the suburbs of Chicago, Illinois. She attended St. Francis High School in Wheaton, Illinois. During a summer while still in high school, Matichak worked as a model in Greece, where she met a talent agent who encouraged her to act. After returning to Chicago, she began taking acting classes. Matichak graduated from St. Francis High School one year early and forwent a full-ride soccer scholarship to attend the University of South Florida, instead moving to New York City to pursue modeling and acting.

Career
Matichak has made guest appearances in numerous television series, such as 666 Park Avenue, Orange Is the New Black, Underground, and Blue Bloods. In 2015, she made her feature film debut in an uncredited role in the Victoria Justice-starring film Naomi and Ely's No Kiss List.

Matichak starred in the horror sequel film Halloween (2018). She plays the role of Allyson Nelson, the daughter of Judy Greer's character Karen Nelson, and the granddaughter of Jamie Lee Curtis' Laurie Strode, whose character also starred in the 1978 original film. She also appears in its two sequels.

Filmography

Film

Television

References

External links
 
 
 
 

21st-century American actresses
Actresses from Massachusetts
American film actresses
American television actresses
21st-century Canadian actresses
Living people
People from Framingham, Massachusetts
Year of birth missing (living people)